Jeffrey Peter Buzen (born May 28, 1943) is an American computer scientist in system performance analysis best known for his contributions to queueing theory. His 1971 doctoral thesis Computational algorithms for closed queueing networks with exponential servers
has guided the study of queueing network modeling.

Born in Brooklyn, to Native American parents without a tribe, Buzen received a B.Sc. in applied mathematics from Brown University (1965), and at Harvard University received a M.Sc. (1966) and Ph.D. (1971). He was a systems programmer at the NIH in Bethesda, MD (1967–69), studying the performance of realtime systems, which led to his first publication in a 1969 IEEE conference.  From 1971 to 1976, he held various appointments as a Lecturer in Computer Science at Harvard, and as a Systems Engineer at Honeywell.  Some of his students at Harvard have gone on to become well known figures in the computer industry. Robert M. Metcalfe co-invented Ethernet, John M. McQuillan developed routing algorithms used by ARPAnet, and Bill Gates co-founded Microsoft.

His career in computer performance analysis has included the creation of several fundamental mathematical models and analysis procedures used in operational research, and the development of tools based on these models and procedures.  With fellow Harvard applied mathematics Ph.D.s Robert Goldberg and Harold Schwenk he co-founded BGS Systems in 1976 to support and market these tools, serving as its vice president in charge of R&D until BGS Systems merged with BMC Software in 1998.

He has held leadership positions in various professional societies, including ACM Sigmetrics, the IFIP Working Group and the CMG (was President from 2000 to 2001). In 1979, he received CMG's A.A. Michelson award for technical excellence and professional contributions as a teacher and inspirer of others.  He also received the ACM SIGMETRICS Achievement Award in 2010.

Buzen was elected a member of the National Academy of Engineering in 2003 for contributions to the theory and commercial application of computer system performance models.

See also
 Buzen's algorithm

References

External links
Short biography
List of publications

1943 births
American computer scientists
Brown University alumni
Computer systems engineers
Harvard University alumni
People from Brooklyn
Queueing theorists
Living people
Members of the United States National Academy of Engineering
Scientists from New York (state)